Andrey Leonidovich Kochemasov (born 10 October 1950) is a Russian chess player who received the title of ICCF title of Correspondence Chess Grandmaster in 2019. He is a World Correspondence Chess Championship winner (2017–2019).

Biography
Andrey Kochemasov graduated to Nizhny Novgorod Medical Institute at the medical faculty. He worked as surgeon and therapist. Twenty years Andrey Kochemasov spent in Eastern Siberia and combining medical activities with commercial hunting. In correspondence chess tournaments he participated from 1974. In 1998, Andrey Kochemasov returned to his native village Gagino and devotes all his free time to correspondence chess tournaments. In 2009, he was awarded the ICCF International Correspondence Chess Master (IM) and International Correspondence Chess Master (SIM) titles. In 2019, Andrey Kochemasov won the 28th World Correspondence Chess Championship (2017–2019). In 2019, he was awarded the ICCF International Correspondence Chess Grandmaster (GM) title.

References

External links
 
 
 

1950 births
Living people
Russian chess players
Soviet chess players
Correspondence chess grandmasters
World Correspondence Chess Champions
People from Sergachsky Uyezd